Csomád is a village in Pest county, Budapest metropolitan area, Hungary. It has a population of 1,193 (2007).

References

 

Populated places in Pest County
Budapest metropolitan area